Ian Kuiler (born 2 January 1975) is a South African cricketer. He played in five first-class matches for Boland and Gauteng from 1995/96 to 1999/00.

References

External links
 

1975 births
Living people
South African cricketers
Boland cricketers
Gauteng cricketers
Sportspeople from Malmesbury